Kaseyville is an unincorporated community in Macon County, in the U.S. state of Missouri.

History
A post office called Kaseyville was established in 1867 and remained in operation until 1908. Singleton L. Kasey, an early postmaster, gave the community his last name.

References

Unincorporated communities in Macon County, Missouri
Unincorporated communities in Missouri